"Hold Up" is a song recorded by American singer Beyoncé for her sixth studio album, Lemonade (2016). The song was serviced to Italian radio on May 27, 2016 as the third single from the album. It was written by Diplo, Ezra Koenig, Beyoncé, Emile Haynie, Josh Tillman, MNEK, and MeLo-X.

The song contains a sample of "Can't Get Used to Losing You" performed by Andy Williams and written by Doc Pomus and Mort Shuman, an interpolation of "Maps" performed by the Yeah Yeah Yeahs and written by Brian Chase, Karen O and Nick Zinner, and an interpolation of "Turn My Swag On", written by Soulja Boy, Antonio Randolph, and Kelvin McConnell.

"Hold Up" received a Grammy nomination for Best Pop Solo Performance at the 59th ceremony.

Composition 
"Hold Up" is written in the key of C major in common time with a tempo of 84 beats per minute.  The song follows a chord progression of C–F–D–G–D–F, and when it comes to Beyonce's vocals, they go from C3 to F5. The track features a light reggae beat.

A demo of "Hold Up" – a simple track containing just a chorus – was first written and recorded by Diplo and Koenig in 2014. Koenig, the frontman of the indie rock band Vampire Weekend, was interested in Diplo's take on the opening of "Can't Get Used to Losing You" by Andy Williams and wrote a hook around it. The lyrics include an interpolation of the chorus of "Maps" by Yeah Yeah Yeahs that Koenig had tweeted three years prior. Beyonce, having heard and liked the demo, gave it to various songwriters to get the best ideas for building on it.

MNEK said he wrote a full song over the demo, but Beyoncé only made use of 3 lines from his song, which were eventually used in the bridge.
He also mentioned the unique process of Beyoncé: "The way she works, she is a writer in herself. And then she pieces together stuff and she pieces together, you know, Diplo's going to work on the track; she's going to send it to me to do a melody idea. That's the process. And it worked because she's overlooking everything."

Father John Misty also said Beyoncé contacted him after she heard his song through Emile Haynie. She gave him the simple demo track and he ended up writing the first verse and refrain. He told NME, "With 'Hold Up' they just sent me the beat and the hook. I wrote that first verse and the 'jealous and crazy' part."
He didn't know if his part would be used or not but later Beyoncé told him in person that his part made the final cut at his 2015 Coachella set.

In the outro of the song, Beyoncé sampled the hook from "Turn My Swag On" by Soulja Boy.
She used the first two lines of the hook twice with slow falsetto vocals to express the feeling between denial and anger.

Critical reception 
"Hold Up" was highly acclaimed by critics, who complimented Beyoncé's vocal performance as well as the lyrics and production.

Pitchfork's Ryan Dombal named "Hold Up" as "Best New Track", calling Beyoncé's vocals "emotive" and stating "The music has no weight, no place, no time—a calypso dream heard through walls and generations...When Beyoncé works in the pained refrain of Yeah Yeah Yeahs' "Maps," she makes it glorious while allowing our memories to hint at the anguish underneath."

Slant considered the song the 4th best one of 2016, while Pitchfork named it the 28th best. The song would later be voted in Village Voice'''s Pazz & Jop best in music in 2016, the 18th best single of the same period. Billboard ranked "Hold Up" at number 23 on their "100 Best Pop Songs of 2016" list: "Beyonce's Lemonade was designed for memes… and tweets… and gifs. But ask anyone the image that defines the album, and you're likely to see a shot from "Hold Up"."

"Hold Up" was named the greatest song of the decade (2010s) by Richard Walker for The National. Commercial performance 
After the release of Lemonade, "Hold Up" debuted and peaked on the US Billboard Hot 100 chart at number 13. "Hold Up" also entered on the Hot R&B/Hip-Hop songs at number 8. In overseas charts, the song entered in multiple digital charts in top 5: Denmark, Greece, Netherlands, New Zealand and Norway.

 Music video 
The song's music video is part of a one-hour film with the same title as its parent album, which originally aired on HBO and was also included with the purchase of the album itself. The Jonas Åkerlund-directed video features Beyoncé destroying multiple cars and security cameras using a baseball bat. The video is often compared by critics to that of Janet Jackson's video to her single "Son of a Gun (I Betcha Think This Song Is About You)" as well as the late 90s art film Ever Is Over All'' by Pipilotti Rist. According to Mashable, Knowles also makes reference of Oshun, the Yoruba goddess of water, fertility, love, and sensuality. The music video received two nominations at the 2016 MTV Video Music Awards for Best Female Video and Best Art Direction, winning the former. One week later, Beyoncé released the music video on her YouTube and Vevo channels.

Live performances 
"Hold Up" is part of the set list of the Formation World Tour with the first performance taking place in Miami at Marlins Park on April 27, 2016.

"Hold Up" was also performed as part of a medley of songs from Lemonade at the 2016 MTV Video Music Awards on August 28, 2016, along with "Pray You Catch Me", "Sorry", "Don't Hurt Yourself", and "Formation".

"Hold Up" was performed at Beyoncé's 2018 Coachella performance, reimagined with a marching band to pay homage to historically black colleges and universities.

In 2018, Beyoncé performed the bridge of “Hold Up” after Jay-Z performed “Bam” during the European and first three North American dates of the OTR II Tour, their second co-headlining, all-stadium tour together.

Charts

Weekly charts

Year-end charts

Certifications

Release history

References

2016 songs
2016 singles
Songs about infidelity
Beyoncé songs
Songs written by Beyoncé
Songs written by Diplo
Songs written by Emile Haynie
Songs written by Ezra Koenig
Songs written by Josh Tillman
Song recordings produced by Beyoncé
Song recordings produced by Diplo
MTV Video Music Award for Best Female Video
Songs written by MNEK
Music videos directed by Jonas Åkerlund
Columbia Records singles